Samuel James Seymour (March 28, 1860 – April 12, 1956) was an American man who was the last surviving person to witness the assassination of U.S. President Lincoln on April 14, 1865.

Personal life 
Seymour was from Talbot County, Maryland. His parents, George and Susan Seymour, had a farm near Easton, Maryland. He later lived in Arlington, Virginia. He worked as a carpenter and contractor, and lived most of his later life in Baltimore. He married Mary Rebecca Twilley. He died April 12, 1956, at the home of his daughter in Arlington, survived by five children, thirteen grandchildren and 35 great-grandchildren. He was buried at Baltimore's Loudon Park Cemetery.

Witness to Lincoln assassination
On April 14, 1865, when Seymour was five years old, Sarah Cook, his nurse, along with his godmother Mrs. Goldsborough, who was the wife of his father's employer, took him to see Our American Cousin at Ford's Theater in Washington, D.C., where they sat in the balcony across the theater from the presidential box. He saw Lincoln come into the box, waving and smiling. Later, "All of a sudden a shot rang out... and someone in the President's box screamed. I saw Lincoln slumped forward in his seat." Seymour watched John Wilkes Booth jump from the box to the stage. He remembered that, not understanding what had happened to Lincoln, he was very concerned for Booth, who broke his leg, disputedly, in the jump.

In 1954, Seymour gave his account of the assassination to the journalist Frances Spatz Leighton.

I've Got a Secret appearance

Exactly nine weeks before his death, Seymour appeared on the February 9, 1956, broadcast of the CBS TV panel show I've Got a Secret. After arriving in New York City he suffered a fall, which left him with a swelling above his right eye. Host Garry Moore, after bringing Seymour on stage, explained that he and the show's producers had urged Seymour to forgo his appearance on the show; that Seymour's doctor had left the choice up to his patient; and that Seymour very much wanted to go on.

During the game, Seymour was first questioned by panellist Bill Cullen, who quickly surmised from Seymour's age that his secret was somehow connected with the American Civil War, then correctly guessed that it had political significance and involved a political figure.  Jayne Meadows then guessed that the political figure was Lincoln, after a fellow contestant jokingly whispered "McKinley," and finally that Seymour had witnessed Lincoln's assassination.  The rules of the show were that he would win $20 for each of the four panellists who failed to guess his secret.  Since the secret was guessed by Jayne Meadows, the second of four panellists, he would normally have won only $20 but the host decided to award the entire $80 jackpot to Seymour for his courage in appearing on the show.  Also because Seymour smoked a pipe rather than cigarettes, the show's sponsor, R. J. Reynolds Tobacco Company gave him a can of Prince Albert pipe tobacco instead of the usual prize of a carton of Winston cigarettes.

See also
List of last survivors of historical events
Joseph Hazelton, another famous witness to the assassination

References

External links

1860 births
1956 deaths
Articles containing video clips
Burials at Loudon Park Cemetery
People associated with the assassination of Abraham Lincoln
People from Arlington County, Virginia
People from Easton, Maryland